Morris Field is a multi-purpose outdoor stadium, located in Arlington Heights, Illinois. The stadium is home to the Robert Morris (Illinois) Eagles football, men's and women's Lacrosse and men's and women's soccer teams.

The stadium was renovated in 2013.

References

Robert Morris Eagles
College football venues
College lacrosse venues in the United States
College soccer venues in the United States
American football venues in Illinois
Lacrosse venues in Illinois
Soccer venues in Illinois